"Promesses" is a song by French producer/DJ Tchami featuring guest vocals from British singer Kaleem Taylor. It was initially released on 24 July 2013 under Fool's Gold Records as part of his free EP Promesses along with "Shot Caller". A radio edit of the song was then re-released on 5 January 2015 as a digital download in the United Kingdom through Ministry of Sound. The song was written by Tchami, Kaleem Taylor and DJ Snake, the latter also co-producing it. The song peaked at number 7 on the UK Singles Chart while topping the UK Indie Chart.

Music video
A music video to accompany the release of "Promesses" was first released onto YouTube on 11 December 2014 at a total length of two minutes and forty seconds.

Track listing

Charts

Certifications

Release history

References

2013 songs
2015 singles
Ministry of Sound singles
Songs written by DJ Snake
Songs written by Tchami